Connor Charles Smith (born 14 October 1996) is an English semi-professional footballer who plays as a winger for Marske United. He has played for Hartlepool United, Whitby Town, Spennymoor Town and York City.

Early life
Smith was born in Stockton-on-Tees, County Durham.

Career

Hartlepool United
Smith joined the youth system of Hartlepool United at under-12 level. He started a two-year scholarship with the club in the summer of 2013. In May 2014, Smith was promoted to the first team for the final match of the 2013–14 season after impressing in his first year as a scholar. He came on as a substitute for Jonathan Franks in the second half of the 2–0 defeat to Exeter City.

On 15 November 2016, Smith joined Northern Premier League Premier Division club Whitby Town on a one-month loan. He made his debut when starting Whitby's 3–2 home defeat to Goole in the Northern Premier League Challenge Cup, in which he was substituted on 59 minutes. He finished the loan with seven appearances. On 23 March 2017, Smith joined Northern Premier League Premier Division club Spennymoor Town on loan until the end of 2016–17. He made his debut two days later as a substitute in a 1–1 draw at home to Halesowen Town.

Non-League
Smith signed for newly relegated National League North club York City on 27 June 2017 on a one-year contract. He joined Northern Premier League Premier Division club Whitby Town on 26 October 2017 on a one-month loan, making his debut two days later as a substitute in a 3–1 home defeat to Marine in the FA Trophy first qualifying round. Smith made 23 appearances and scored one goal as York ranked 11th place in the table in 2017–18. He was released at the end of the season.

Smith signed for Northern Premier League Division One East club Frickley Athletic on 26 May 2018.

On 21 February 2020, Smith joined Marske United.

Career statistics

References

External links

Connor Smith profile at the Frickley Athletic F.C. website

1996 births
Living people
Footballers from Stockton-on-Tees
Footballers from County Durham
English footballers
Association football wingers
Hartlepool United F.C. players
Whitby Town F.C. players
Spennymoor Town F.C. players
York City F.C. players
Frickley Athletic F.C. players
English Football League players
Northern Premier League players
National League (English football) players